Indus Kohistani (Kōstaiñ) is an Indo-Aryan language spoken in the former Kohistan District of Pakistan. The language was referred to as Maiyã (Mayon) or Shuthun by early researchers, but subsequent observations have not verified that these names are known locally.

Phonology
The phonology of Indus Kohistani varies between its major dialects as shown below.

Vowels

In the Kanyawali dialect, the back vowels /u/ and /o/ are described as variants of each other, as are the front vowels /i/ and /e/.

Consonants

The consonant inventory of Indus Kohistani is shown in the chart below. (Consonants particular to the Kanyawali Dialect of Tangir and those found only in the Kohistan Dialects are color-coded respectively.)

The phonemes /x/, /ɣ/, and /q/ are mainly found in loan words. The status of /q/ in the Kanyawali Dialect is unclear. The sounds /f, v/ can also be bilabial [ɸ, β].

See also
Kohistan District, Pakistan
Kohistani people
Shina Kohistani

References

Bibliography

Dardic languages
Languages of Khyber Pakhtunkhwa